First International Telecom (FITEL) was a mobile phone operator in Taiwan. Launched in April 1997 as a paging company, FITEL expanded in May 2001 by launching a PHS network. It declared bankruptcy in 2014.

See also
 List of companies of Taiwan

References

Mobile phone companies of Taiwan
Bankrupt mobile phone companies
Telecommunications companies established in 1997
Defunct companies of Taiwan
1997 establishments in Taiwan
2014 disestablishments in Taiwan